The current National Development League formerly the National League was formed in 2009 as the third division of speedway in the United Kingdom, replacing the Conference League. It follows the same rules and regulations as the SGB Premiership and SGB Championship, including the use of rider averages.

There were two previous speedway leagues in Britain sharing the 'National League' name, the main league that operated from 1932 to 1964, and British League Division Two, which was renamed the National League between 1975 and 1990.

History

Overview 
The current National Development League, originally the Conference League, was formed in 2009 with ten teams. Several teams were in the league in the past, but are no longer in speedway for various reasons, such as Newport, Bournemouth, and Weymouth. These were replaced in more recent years by Kent in 2013, along with Birmingham and Eastbourne, former Elite League teams. After a decline in National League teams to eight in 2013, the National League has increased to 11 teams as of late 2017.

2009-2013 
In the early years of the National League, Plymouth was a National League team; however, they went into the Premier League at the start of the 2011 season. The teams Newport, Bournemouth, and Weymouth left speedway around this time.

2014-present 
At the start of the 2014 season, the Dudley Heathens National League team changed its name to Cradley Heathens. This was accompanied in 2014 by short spells of the teams Devon and Scunthorpe. These two teams returned completely to the Premier League in 2015, but Eastbourne and Birmingham joined the National League that same year.

In 2017, the Plymouth Devils, under new management, joined the National League.
In 2019, Leicester Lion Cubs joined the newly named National Development League, with Birmingham and Eastbourne leaving the league and moving up to the SGB Championship and Coventry not applying to race in 2019.

Rules
The rules follow those of the SGB Premiership and SGB Championship with some relaxation of regulations. Riders who hold a non-British FMN licence are not permitted to compete in the National League.

Champions

See also
List of United Kingdom Speedway League Champions

References

 
Speedway leagues
Speedway competitions in the United Kingdom
Professional sports leagues in the United Kingdom